Mikumo may refer to:

Mikumo, Mie, a former town in Ichishi District, Mie, Japan
Mikumo Station, a railway station in Konan, Shiga, Japan
Mikumo Guynemer, a character in the anime series Macross Delta

People with the surname
, Japanese writer
, Japanese announcer

Japanese-language surnames